Grant Lucas Riller (born February 8, 1997) is an American professional basketball player for the Texas Legends of the NBA G League. He played college basketball for the College of Charleston Cougars.

High school career
Riller played basketball for Ocoee High School in Ocoee, Florida under head coach Rob Gordon. He was called up to the varsity team in ninth grade after initially playing at the junior varsity level. As a senior on December 28, 2014, Riller scored a school-record 53 points in a win over Leesburg High School in the finals of the Ocoee Great 8 tournament. He averaged 29.1 points per game in his senior season. Riller was deemed a two-star recruit by 247Sports and was not rated by ESPN or Rivals. On October 4, 2014, he committed to play college basketball for the College of Charleston over offers from Cleveland State, FIU, and Hofstra.

College career

Riller suffered a knee injury prior to his freshman season and was forced to redshirt. He was forced to wear a knee brace despite working all summer to get to full strength. In his collegiate debut, Riller scored 21 points against The Citadel. He averaged 13.1 points per game as a freshman, second-best on the team. Riller scored 20 points and added four steals in a 83–76 overtime victory over Northeastern in the Colonial Athletic Association Tournament. He was named 2018 CAA Tournament Most Outstanding player and joined teammate Joe Chealey on the All-CAA First Team. Riller averaged 18.7 points per game as a sophomore. He scored a career-high 43 points in a 99–95 loss to Hofstra. As a junior, Riller averaged 21.9 points and 4.1 assists per game and led the Cougars to a 24–9 record. He was again named first-team All-CAA.

Coming into his senior year, Riller was named CAA preseason player of the year. On December 14, 2019, Riller became the third Cougar in program history to reach the 2,000 career point mark, scoring 21 in a road loss to Richmond. On January 16, 2020, he recorded the first-ever triple-double by a College of Charleston player, with 20 points, 10 rebounds and 10 assists in a loss to Northeastern. At the conclusion of the regular season, Riller was named to the First Team All-CAA. As a senior, Riller averaged 21.9 points, 3.9 assists, and 5.1 rebounds per game.

Professional career

Charlotte Hornets (2020–2021)
On November 18, 2020, Riller was drafted in the second round, 56th overall, in the 2020 NBA draft by the Charlotte Hornets. On November 30, 2020 he was signed to a two-way contract by the team. Under the terms of the deal, he split time between the Hornets and their NBA G League affiliate, the Greensboro Swarm.

Delaware Blue Coats (2021)
On August 30, 2021, Riller signed a two-way contract with the Philadelphia 76ers. However, he was waived on December 19 after making four appearances for the Delaware Blue Coats, Philadelphia's affiliate.

Texas Legends (2022–present)
On November 3, 2022, Riller was named to the opening night roster of the Texas Legends.

Career statistics

NBA

|-
| style="text-align:left;"| 
| style="text-align:left;"| Charlotte
| 7 || 0 || 3.9 || .667 || .500 || — || .1 || .4 || .1 || .0 || 2.6
|- class="sortbottom"
| style="text-align:center;" colspan="2"| Career
| 7 || 0 || 3.9 || .667 || .500 || — || .1 || .4 || .1 || .0 || 2.6

College

|-
| style="text-align:left;"| 2015–16
| style="text-align:left;"| College of Charleston
| style="text-align:center;" colspan="11"|  Redshirt
|-
| style="text-align:left;"| 2016–17
| style="text-align:left;"| College of Charleston
| 35 || 27 || 27.0 || .486 || .333 || .798 || 2.1 || 1.2 || .9 || .2 || 13.1
|-
| style="text-align:left;"| 2017–18
| style="text-align:left;"| College of Charleston
| 33 || 32 || 33.6 || .545 || .394 || .729 || 2.8 || 2.0 || 1.3 || .4 || 18.6
|-
| style="text-align:left;"| 2018–19
| style="text-align:left;"| College of Charleston
| 33 || 33 || 35.5 || .538 || .329 || .806 || 3.4 || 4.1 || 1.2 || .1 || 21.9
|-
| style="text-align:left;"| 2019–20
| style="text-align:left;"| College of Charleston
| 31 || 31 || 33.5 || .499 || .362 || .827 || 5.1 || 3.9 || 1.6 || .3 || 21.9
|- class="sortbottom"
| style="text-align:center;" colspan="2"| Career
| 132 || 123 || 32.3 || .519 || .356 || .796 || 3.3 || 2.8 || 1.3 || .3 || 18.7

References

External links
College of Charleston Cougars bio

1997 births
Living people
American men's basketball players
Basketball players from Orlando, Florida
Charlotte Hornets draft picks
Charlotte Hornets players
College of Charleston Cougars men's basketball players
Delaware Blue Coats players
Greensboro Swarm players
Point guards